The 2018–19 American Eagles men's basketball team represented American University during the 2018–19 NCAA Division I men's basketball season. The Eagles, led by sixth-year head coach Mike Brennan, played their home games at Bender Arena in Washington, D.C. as members of the Patriot League. They finished the season 15–15, 9–9 in Patriot League play to finish in fourth place. They lost in the quarterfinals of the Patriot League tournament to Navy.

Previous season 
They finished the 2017–18 season 6–24, 3–15 in Patriot League play to finish in last place. They lost in the first round of the Patriot League tournament to Lafayette.

Offseason

Departures

Incoming transfers

2018 recruiting class

2019 recruiting class

Roster

Source

Schedule and results

|-
!colspan=9 style=| Non-conference regular season

|-
!colspan=9 style=| Patriot League regular season

|-
!colspan=9 style=| Patriot League tournament

Source

See also
2018–19 American Eagles women's basketball team

References

American Eagles men's basketball seasons
American
American Eagles men's basketball
American Eagles men's basketball